Along with his new novel, Cargill Falls, William Lychack is the author of five previous books: The Wasp Eater (a novel), The Architect of Flowers(stories), a cultural history of cement, and two titles for children. His work has appeared in Conjunctions, Ploughshares, The Southern Review, The American Scholar, Story Magazine, and elsewhere, including The Best American Short Stories, The Pushcart Prize, and on public radio’s This American Life. He has received a National Endowment for the Arts Fellowship, a Christopher Isherwood Foundation Award, a Sherwood Anderson Award, a Pittsburgh Foundation Grant, and has been a Barnes and Noble Discover Great New Writers Selection. He has worked as an editor at New England Review and Guideposts Magazine, and he has also taught at the University of Michigan, the University of Minnesota, Connecticut College, and Lesley University. From 2006 to 2010 he was the Charles Murray Writer-in-Residence at Phillips Academy. He is currently an associate professor in The Writing Program at University of Pittsburgh.

Selected books
Cargill Falls, a novel
The Wasp Eater, a novel
 The Architect of Flowers, short stories

Selected Short Fiction

 "Cargill Falls," Story Magazine
 "Brownie Versus Mouse," Washington Square Review
 "Fidelity," The New Ohio Review 
 "Griswald," The Sun Magazine

Selected Nonfiction

 "The Lady and the Monk," The American Scholar
 "In Memory of a Mentor," NPR
 "Notes Toward a Greater Unbalancing," The Southern Review

References

External links
 "The Shard," The Forge Literary Magazine
 Maureen Corrigan reviews The Wasp Eater

Living people
21st-century American novelists
American male novelists
American male short story writers
21st-century American short story writers
21st-century American male writers
Year of birth missing (living people)
University of Michigan people
Connecticut College alumni